...En their medh ríki fara... (Old Norse, "...And in Glory Will They Go...") is the debut studio album by the German Viking metal band Falkenbach. The album was recorded and mixed between 18–21 December 1995 and 07-9 March 1996 at Blue House Studio. There are two CD versions of this album. The first came with a picture of Vratyas Vakyas in the booklet. Due to the album booklet's poor quality, the booklet was changed for the second version. A microcassette version was limited to 250 copies.

Track listing

 The song "Læknishendr" appeared in early forms on the Læknishendr and Promo 1995 demos. It was re-recorded once more for the Heralding - The Fireblade album in 2005.
 The song "...Into the Ardent Awaited Land..." first appeared on the ...Skínn af sverði sól valtíva... demo, and as an acoustic re-recording for the Ok nefna tysvar Ty album in 2003.
 The song "Galdralag" is a re-recording of the song with the same name from the band's Promo 1995 demo.
 A remake of the song "Ultima Thule" (titled "Return to Ultima Thule") was included as a bonus track on the limited edition of the Falkenbach 2013 Asa album.

Personnel
 Vratyas Vakyas - all instruments, vocals

Additional stuff
 F. Tümmers - artwork
 P. Tümmers - artwork
 Christophe Szpajdel - logo

References 

Falkenbach albums
1996 debut albums